Sir Edmund Charles Workman-Macnaghten, 2nd Baronet (1 April 1790 – 6 January 1876) was an Irish baronet and Conservative Party politician. He was a Member of Parliament (MP) for Antrim from 1847 to 1852.

He was the son of Sir Francis Workman-Macnaghten, 1st Baronet, and his wife Laetitia Dunkin, daughter of Sir William Dunkin. He was born in Dublin, and educated at Charterhouse School and Trinity College Dublin. He was called to the Irish Bar in 1818. He was then a master in chancery in Bengal.

Family
Workman-Macnaghten married in 1827 Mary Gwatkin, only child of Edward Gwatkin, and niece of Robert Lovell Gwatkin. They had five sons and two daughters.

Francis Edmund, who became the 3rd Baronet.
Edward Macnaghten, Baron Macnaghten, second son, became a Lord of Appeal.
William, of the 1st Bengal Light Infantry
Fergus (died 1867), of the Bengal Civil Service
Charles Edmund of the Royal Artillery, the youngest son, was killed on 17 March 1861 in the First Taranaki War.
Mary, the elder daughter, died in 1857 at age 25. She has been associated with the early history from the 1850s of croquet in the United Kingdom.
Octavia, married Colin Glencairn Campbell, son of Admiral Colin Campbell of Ardpatrick.

References

External links 
 

1790 births
1876 deaths
People educated at Charterhouse School
Alumni of Trinity College Dublin
Baronets in the Baronetage of the United Kingdom
UK MPs 1847–1852
Irish Conservative Party MPs
Members of the Parliament of the United Kingdom for County Antrim constituencies (1801–1922)
People from County Antrim